Tracy Grimshaw (born 3 June 1960) is an Australian journalist and television presenter. She was the host of A Current Affair between 2006–2022, and was a co-host of Today between 1996–2005.

Career
Grimshaw's career began in 1981 when she joined Nine News in Melbourne as a reporter. In 1985 she began presenting news bulletins and by 1987 had been appointed the presenter of Nine Morning News.

Through the early 1990s, Grimshaw reported on overseas events for the Nine Network, as well as reporting for A Current Affair and hosting the program over the summer non-ratings period.

In 1995, Grimshaw appeared as co-host of The Midday Show with David Reyne. The following year she was host of Today on Saturday and Animal Hospital.

On 4 November 1996, Grimshaw was appointed the co-host of Today with Steve Liebmann, a position she held for nine years. She finished her role as co-host of Today on 23 December 2005 and was replaced by Jessica Rowe.

In 2005, Grimshaw played the news reporter character Katie Current in the Australian cinema and DVD release of Shark Tale (the original lines were provided by American journalist Katie Couric).

On 30 January 2006, Grimshaw began presenting A Current Affair, replacing Ray Martin. In May 2006, she interviewed Beaconsfield Mine collapse survivors Todd Russell and Brant Webb in a special two-hour presentation called The Great Escape. Grimshaw was a nominee for the Gold Logie in 2018. On 5 September 2022, Grimshaw announced that she would step down as host of A Current Affair on 24 November 2022 after 17 years.

Personal life
Grimshaw grew up in Greensborough, Victoria. On 7 May 2015, she was involved in a horse riding accident believed to have been at her property in Sydney's north-western suburbs. She was airlifted to Westmead Hospital.

Grimshaw supports St Kilda Football Club in the Australian Football League.

References

External links
 A Current Affair website

1960 births
Living people
Australian journalists
Australian women journalists
Australian television presenters
Australian women television presenters
Journalists from Melbourne
People from Greensborough, Victoria
Television personalities from Melbourne